Cricket, though one of the most popular sports in the world, has not seen the popularity that other sports have seen in the film and television industry. There are very few cricket themed movies and mini-series.

Cricket themed

Documentary
 Prince Ranjitsinhji Practising Batting in the Nets (1897) (Australia)
 Trobriand Cricket: An Ingenious Response to Colonialism (1976) (Australia/Papua New Guinea)
 Not Cricket: The Basil d'Oliveira Conspiracy (2004) (UK)
 Cricket and the Meaning of Life (2005) (Canada)
 An Aussie Goes Barmy (2006) (Australia)
 An Aussie Goes Bolly (2008) (Australia)
 Breaking Boundaries (2008) (Ireland)
 Out of the Ashes (2010) (UK/Afghanistan)
 Fire in Babylon (2010) (UK)
 From the Ashes (2011) (UK)
 Cricket Nation (2012) (Canada)
 Cricket & Parc Ex: A Love Story (2015) (Canada)
 Beyond All Boundaries (2014) (USA/India)
 Death of a Gentleman (2015) (UK)
 Sachin: A Billion Dreams (2017) (India)

Films
 The Final Test (1953) (UK)
 The Shout (1978) (UK)
 Outside Edge (1982) (UK)
 P'tang, Yang, Kipperbang (1982) (UK)
 Arthur's Hallowed Ground (1984) (UK)
 Playing Away (1987) (UK)
 Awwal Number (1990) (India)
 Lagaan: Once Upon a Time in India (2001) (India)
 I Love You Da (2002) (India)
 Stumped (2003) (India)
 Wondrous Oblivion (2003) (UK)
 Iqbal (2005) (India)
 Chennai 600028 (2007) (India)
 Chain Kulii Ki Main Kulii (2007) (India)
 Say Salaam India (2007) (India)
 Meerabai Not Out (2008) (India)
 Jannat (2008) (India)
 Hansie (2008) (South Africa)
 I Know How Many Runs You Scored Last Summer (2008) (Australia)
 Victory (2009) (India)
 Hit for Six (2009) (Barbados)
 World Cupp 2011 (2009) (India)
 99 (2009) (India)
 Dil Bole Hadippa! (2009) (India)
 Le Chakka (2010) (India)
 Patiala House (2011) (India)
 Sinhawalokanaya (2011) (Sri Lanka)
 Tangiwai (2011) (New Zealand)
 Golconda High School (2011) (India)
 Potta Potti (2011) (India)
Dhoni (2012) (India)
 Ferrari Ki Sawaari (2012) (India)
 Main Hoon Shahid Afridi (2013) (Pakistan)
 1983 (2014) (India)
 Jeeva (2014) (India)
 Bangalore 560023 (2015) (India)
 Azhar (2016) (India)
 M.S. Dhoni: The Untold Story (2016) (India)
 Chennai 600028 II (2016) (India)
 22 Yards (2018) (India)
Kanaa (2018) (India)
 The Zoya Factor (2019) (India)
 Jersey (2019) (India)
Majili (2019) (India)
83 (2021) (India)
Kaun Pravin Tambe? (2022) (India)
Jersey (2022) (India)
Shabaash Mithu (2022) (India)

TV series
 The Magnificent Six and a Half – episode: It's Not Cricket (1969) (UK)
 Dad's Army – episode 4.10: The Test (1970) (UK)
All Creatures Great and Small - episode 2.9: The Name of the Game (1978) (UK)
 Doctor Who - Black Orchid (1982) (UK)
 Bodyline: It's Not Just Cricket (1984) (Australia)
 Ever Decreasing Circles – episode 2.2: The Cricket Match (1984) (UK)
 Malgudi Days – episodes: various (1986) (India)
 Inspector Morse – episode: Deceived by Flight (1989) (UK)
 Duck Tales – episode 1.51 – Take Me Out of the Ballgame (Duckworth mistakes Baseball for Cricket) (1987) (USA)
 Grace & Favour - episode 2.2: "The Cricket Match" (1993) (UK)
 Outside Edge (a UK sitcom based on the stage play of the same name) (1994–1996) (UK)
 Gower's Cricket Monthly (1995-1998) (UK)
 Sports Night – episode: 1.21 Ten Wickets (1999) (USA)
 Midsomer Murders – episodes 2.3: "Dead Man's Eleven" (1999), 19.3: "Last Man Out" (2017) (UK)
 The Inspector Lynley Mysteries – episode 2.1: Playing for the Ashes (2002) (UK)
 Cricket Star (2006–2007) (India)
 Champions of the World (2007–2008) (India)
 Jersey No. 10 (2007–2008) (India)
 Extraaa Innings T20 (2008–2017) (India) 
 Taarak Mehta Ka Ooltah Chashmah (A fictional cricket tournament "Gokuldham Premiere League" takes place in the series) (2008–2014) (India)
 Empire of Cricket (2009) (UK)
 Knights and Angels (2009) (India)
 Best of Luck Nikki – episode 1.3: Narendra Tauji – A Cricket Freak (2011) (India)
 Howzat! Kerry Packer's War (2012) (Australia)
 The Suite Life of Karan & Kabir – episode 1.15: Big Hair & Cricket (2012) (India)
 Downton Abbey — episode 3.8 (2012) (UK)
 Suraj: The Rising Star (2012–2013) (India)
 Howzzattt (2013) (India)
 Father Brown (2013 TV series) — episode 3.5: "The Last Man" (2015) (UK)
 Sumit Sambhal Lega — episode: Haldighati Ka Senapati (2015) (India)
 Mid Wicket Tales (2015–2016) (India)
 Tamanna (2016) (India)
 ICC Cricket 360° (2016–present) (USA)
 Inside Edge (2017–present) (India)
 The Night Watchmen (2018–present) (Australia)
 Jio Dhan Dhana Dhan (2018) (India)
 Selection Day (2018–2019) (India)
 Cricket Fever: Mumbai Indians (2019) (India)
 Roar of The Lion (2019) (India)
 The Test: A New Era for Australia's Team (2020) (Australia)
 Bandon Mein Tha Dum (2022) (India)
 Baarwan Khiladi (2022) (Pakistan)
 Sixer (2022) (India)

Indoor cricket
 Full Toss (2004–2005) (India) 
 Box Cricket League (2014–2019) (India)
 Box Cricket League - Punjab (BCL Punjab) (2016) (India)

Cricket scenes

Australia
 The Paul Hogan Show – episodes: multiple (1973–1984)
 Neighbours – episodes: multiple (1985–)
 Anzacs (1985)
 Home and Away – episodes: multiple (1988–)
 The Bounty – (1995 Kinopanorama documentary)
 The Dish (2000)
 Look Both Ways (2005)
 Hi-5 - series 11, episodes 10, 18, and 22, series 12, episode 18
 Dance Academy – episode 20: Ballet Fever (2010)

Canada
 Tommy Tricker and the Stamp Traveller (1988)
 Road to Avonlea (serial) – episode 2.2: How kissing was discovered (1990)
 Seducing Doctor Lewis ("La Grande Séduction") (2003)
 The Grand Seduction (2013) (an English-language remake of Seducing Doctor Lewis)

India
 Love Marriage (1959)
 Masoom (1983)
 All Rounder (1984)
 Chamatkar (1992)
 Darr (1993)
 Hum Aapke Hain Kaun (1994)
 Pyaar Kiya To Darna Kya (1998)
 Mission Kashmir (2000)
 Chori Chori Chupke Chupke (2001)
 Kabhi Khushi Kabhi Gham (2001)
 Monsoon Wedding (2001)
 Priyamana Thozhi (2003)
 Mujhse Shaadi Karogi (2004)
 Hattrick (2005)
 Dhoondte Reh Jaaoge (2009)
 Special 26 (2013)
 Kai Po Che! (2013)
 Sachin! Tendulkar Alla (2014)
 Happy Bhag Jayegi (2016)
 Sairat (2017)

Pakistan
 Sadqay Tumhare (2014)

United Kingdom
 Tom Brown's Schooldays (1916)
 A Cottage on Dartmoor (1929)
 Badger's Green (1934)
 It's Not Cricket (1937)
 The Lady Vanishes (1938)
 Goodbye, Mr Chips (1939)
 Night Train to Munich (1940)
 Badger's Green (1949)
 It's Not Cricket (1949)
 Three Men in a Boat (1956)
 The Bridge on the River Kwai (1957)
 The Avengers – episode: Honey for the Prince (1966)
 Accident (1967)
 Carry On Follow That Camel (1967)
 The Charge of the Light Brigade (1968)
 Oh! What a Lovely War (1969)
 Monty Python's Flying Circus (1969–1974)
 The Go-Between (1970)
 Tom Brown's Schooldays (1971)
 Love Thy Neighbour (1973)
 Fawlty Towers – episode 1.6 The Germans (1975)
 The Shout (1978)
 Tinker Tailor Soldier Spy (1979)
 Doctor Who – episode:  Black Orchid (1982)
 Chariots of Fire (1981)
 Bergerac (1981–1991)
 The Young Ones – episode 2.2: Cash and 2.6: Summer Holiday (1984)
 Charters and Caldicott (1985)
 Yes, Prime Minister – episode 1.3: The Smoke Screen (1986)
 A Bit of Fry & Laurie (1986–1994)
 Hope and Glory (1987)
 In Sickness and in Health – episode 3.6 (1987)
 Maurice (1987)
 Keeping Up Appearances (1990–1995)
 The Crying Game (1992)
 The Buddha of Suburbia (1993)
 Welcome To Sarajevo (1997)
 Full Circle with Michael Palin – episode 4: Cricket in Hanoi (1997)
 Midsomer Murders – episode 8 – Dead man's 11 (1999), episode 112 – Last Man Out (2017)
 The League of Gentlemen (1999–2002)
 Chicken Run (2000)
 Da Ali G Show (2000)
 Bend It Like Beckham (2002)
 Bridget Jones: The Edge of Reason (2004)
 Himalaya with Michael Palin (2004)
 Shaun of the Dead (2004)
 The Proposition (2005)
 Tom Brown's Schooldays (2005)
 Alex Rider: Stormbreaker (2006)
 Becoming Jane (2007)
 Kingdom TV Series – episode 2.4 (2008)
 Slumdog Millionaire (2008)
 St Trinian's II: The Legend of Fritton's Gold (2009)
 Sherlock Holmes (2009)
 Sherlock Holmes: A Game of Shadows (2011)
 The Best Exotic Marigold Hotel (2011)

United States
 Mary Poppins (1964)
 This is Spinal Tap (1984)
 The Simpsons – episodes: various (1989–)
 Teenage Mutant Ninja Turtles (1990)
 King Ralph (1991)
 The Beach (2000)
 Vertical Limit (2000)
 The West Wing – episode 1.22: "What Kind of Day has it Been?" (2000)
 Master and Commander: The Far Side of the World (2003)
 Finding Neverland (2004)
 The Chronicles of Narnia: The Lion, the Witch and the Wardrobe (2005)
 Syriana (2005)
 Arrested Development - "The Ocean Walker" (2005)
 A Good Year (2006)
 Studio 60 on the Sunset Strip – episode 1.4: "The West Coast Delay" (2006)
 Californication (2007)
 The Big Bang Theory – episode 1.8: "The Grasshopper Experiment" (2007)
 The Darjeeling Limited (2007)
 Lost – episode 4.2: "Confirmed Dead" (2007)
 The Deal (2008)
 Fool's Gold (2008)
 Frost/Nixon (2008)
 Something Borrowed (2011)
 Safe House (2012)
 Family Guy – episodes: various (1999-)
 Blended (2014)
 Million Dollar Arm'' (2014)

See also
Cricket in fiction
Cricket poetry

References

Cricket on television
Cricket culture